Maple is an unincorporated community in Waconia Township, Carver County, Minnesota, United States.  The community is located along Carver County Road 10 near Mayer and Waconia.

References

Unincorporated communities in Carver County, Minnesota
Unincorporated communities in Minnesota